Eduardo Ribeiro dos Santos (born 5 August 1980 in São João, Piauí) is a Brazilian footballer who plays as striker for Ríver.

Career

France
Dos Santos scored his first goal for Guingamp, a penalty against Strasbourg. He gained many admirers due to his versatile play exhibited with Grasshoppers playing opposite Richard Nuñez.

On 9 May 2009, dos Santos entered French football history by scoring both his team's goals in a 2–1 triumph in the Coupe de France final against Stade Rennais FC, despite his side being a Ligue 2 club at the time.

Dos Santos joined promoted Ligue 1 club RC Lens in July 2009 after agreeing to a three-year deal.

After two stints with AC Ajaccio, dos Santos signed an eighteen-month contract with Ligue 2 club FC Metz in January 2014.

Return to Brazil
Eduardo returned to Brazil in June 2014, after 13 years in Europe, signing for Ríver in his native state of Piauí. In between spells with Ríver, he featured for Altos and Campinense in Campeonato Brasileiro Série C and, in 2019, for Treze in 2019 Campeonato Brasileiro Série C, where he was joint top scorer with 8 goals. He returned to Ríver for the 2020 season.

Personal life

Born in Brazil, dos Santos applied for Swiss citizenship in September 2006 after having lived in Switzerland for six years, thus enabling him to play for the Swiss national team.

Honours 
Grasshoppers
Swiss Super League: 2002–03

Guingamp
Coupe de France: 2008–09

Metz
Ligue 2: 2013–14

River
Campeonato Piauiense: 2015, 2016, 2019

Fortaleza
Copa dos Campeões Cearenses: 2016

References

External links
 
 
 

1980 births
Living people
Brazilian footballers
Brazilian emigrants to Switzerland
Swiss people of Brazilian descent
Expatriate footballers in France
Expatriate footballers in Switzerland
Association football forwards
Naturalised citizens of Switzerland
Campeonato Brasileiro Série B players
Campeonato Brasileiro Série C players
Campeonato Brasileiro Série D players
Swiss Super League players
Ligue 2 players
Ligue 1 players
Esporte Clube Flamengo players
Joinville Esporte Clube players
Grasshopper Club Zürich players
En Avant Guingamp players
RC Lens players
AC Ajaccio players
FC Metz players
River Atlético Clube players
Fortaleza Esporte Clube players
Associação Atlética de Altos players
Treze Futebol Clube players
Campinense Clube players
Troféu Brasil de Atletismo winners
Sportspeople from Piauí